Shorey may refer to:

Anil Shorey, Indian infantry officer and writer, official spokesman for the Indian army
Ankita Shorey, Indian actress and a former model
Dan Shorey, former Grand Prix motorcycle road racer
Nicky Shorey (born 1981), English footballer
Pablo Shorey (born 1983), male wrestler from Cuba
Paul Shorey (1857–1934), American classical scholar
Ranvir Shorey (born 1972), Indian actor and former VJ
William T. Shorey (1859–1919), late 19th Century American whaling ship captain

See also
Shorey House (disambiguation)
Sherrey
Shorea